Patrick Murphy House may refer to:

Patrick Murphy House (Windsor, Connecticut), listed on the National Register of Historic Places (NRHP) in Hartford County, Connecticut
 Patrick Murphy Three-Decker, Worcester, Massachusetts, NRHP-listed
Patrick Murphy House (Natchez, Mississippi), listed on the NRHP in Adams County, Mississippi

See also
Murphy House (disambiguation)